Lea Rakel Hiltunen (née Lyytikäinen; born 2 July 1940 in Keitele) is a Finnish social worker and politician. She was a member of the Parliament of Finland from 1999 to 2015, representing the Social Democratic Party of Finland (SDP).

References

1940 births
Living people
People from Keitele
Social Democratic Party of Finland politicians
Members of the Parliament of Finland (1999–2003)
Members of the Parliament of Finland (2003–07)
Members of the Parliament of Finland (2007–11)
Members of the Parliament of Finland (2011–15)